Vaudhu is a 1993 Maldivian drama film written and directed by Yoosuf Rafeeu. Produced by Ibrahim Dawood under Bukhari Films, the film stars Yoosuf Rafeeu and Mariyam Shakeela in lead roles.

Premise
Afzal (Yoosuf Rafeeu), a young man from a wealthy family returns to the Maldives for a study-break and meets Fazla (Mariyam Shakeela), daughter of Shareefa (Sithi Fulhu), the woman who worked as a servant in his house during his childhood. Afzal invites Fazla for a celebration party being hosted for him to which Fazla did not appear noting the difference in their societal standards. Afzal starts an affair with Fazla while his mother disapproves the relationship and arranges his marriage with another girl from a reputed family, Sheryna.

Cast 
 Yoosuf Rafeeu as Afzal
 Mariyam Shakeela as Fazla
 Abdul Raheem Rashad as Ishmath Abdul Majeed
 Arifa Ibrahim as Sheereena
 Easa Shareef as Fazla's brother
 Athifa as Sheryna
 Sithi Fulhu as Shareefa
 Koyya Hassan Manik as Abdul Ghafoor

Soundtrack

References

Maldivian drama films
1993 films
1993 drama films
Dhivehi-language films